Geneina (sometimes Al-Junaynah) (lit. the little garden) is a city in West Darfur, part of dar Masalit region, that joined British Sudan at the end of 1919 through the Gilani agreement signed between the Masalit Sultanate and the Kingdom of Britain, according to which it became a territory.

It is now the capital of the Sudanese state of West Darfur. As of 2008, it had a population of 252,744.

Climate
Geneina has a hot semi-arid climate (Köppen BSh) with two distinct seasons: a short, warm and humid wet season from mid-June to late September and a long, hot, desiccating dry season covering the remaining nine months of the year.

Transportation 
The locality is served by the Geneina Airport .

References

Populated places in West Darfur
Darfur
State capitals in Sudan